The New Zealand men's national beach handball team is the national team of New Zealand. It takes part in international beach handball competitions.

In 2016 New Zealand Mens Beach Handball team won their first international game against Australia in a shootout at Coolangatta, Gold Coast, Australia. They went on to lose Game 2 and miss qualification for the World Champs.

In 2018, New Zealand received a wild card entry to the 2018 Beach Handball World Championships in Kazan, Russia. They finished 16th in their first outing, taking Vietnam to penalties and having narrow losses to USA, Australia and Argentina.

At the 2022 Oceania Qualification tournament held at Coolangatta, Gold Coast, Australia, New Zealand beat Australia in Game 1, lost to Australia in Game 2 and beat Australia in a Game 3 shootout to win entry to the 2022 Beach Handball World Championships in June in Crete, Greece and the 2022 World Games in Birmingham, Alabama, USA in July.

International results

World Championships

Oceania Championship

World Games

Current Team 
The current team for the 2022 Beach Handball World Championship.

World Championships

2018 World Championship 
The 2018 World Championship was hosted in Kazan, Russia. It was New Zealand's first world championship appearance after receiving a wild card entry to the tournament. The team finished 16th after group stage losses to Hungary, Spain and a penalty shoot-out loss to Vietnam, followed by losses to The United States of America, Australia, Argentina, Qatar, Vietnam and Uruguay.

Results

Group stage

Consolation round

Placement Round

2022 World Championship 
The 2022 World Championship was hosted in Crete, Greece. It was New Zealand's second appearance in a world championship, the first time the nation qualified through the Oceania Beach Handball Championships. The team finished 14th having recorded their first world championship wins against Puerto Rico and Egypt.

Results

Group stage

Consolation round

Placement Round

Oceania Championships

References

External links
Official website
IHF profile

National beach handball teams
Men's national sports teams of New Zealand